Ufens may refer to:
 Ufens, a character in Virgil's The Aeneid as well as Silius' Punica
 Ufens (wasp), a wasp genus in the family Trichogrammatidae
 Ufens, U Fogg E' Nu Squadron